Zabrus fuentei is a species of black coloured ground beetle in the Iberozabrus subgenus that is endemic to Spain. The species is dedicated to the Spanish entomologist José María de la Fuente.

References

Beetles described in 2008
Beetles of Europe
Endemic fauna of Spain
Zabrus